Many, or perhaps most, law schools in the United States grade on a norm-referenced grading curve. The process generally works within each class, where the instructor grades each exam, and then ranks the exams against each other, adding to and subtracting from the initial grades so that the overall grade distribution matches the school's specified curve (usually a bell curve).  "The curve" is the permitted range of each letter grade that can be awarded, for example, 0-3% A+, 3-7% A, etc.  Curves vary between different law schools, as do the rules for when the curve is mandatory versus suggestive.  It is common for the curve to be mandatory for first-year ("1L") courses, and for classes above a certain size.

Grading on a curve contributes to the notoriously competitive atmosphere within law schools. "The main source of this competition is the mandatory curve you will likely encounter once you enter law school. The curve affects the class rank, affects the chances of making law review, affects the chances of scoring that big job/externship." Some law schools set their curve lower to retain scholarship funding; others set their curve higher to make their students more competitive in the job market.

The following list shows where law schools set the 50% mark for an individual class subject to the curve.  Because not all classes are curved and because professors still have discretion within the curve's ranges, where a law school sets its curve is not necessarily revealing of that school's average student GPA (whether after 1L or upon graduation).

The list

Class rank and GPA not reported
 American University Washington College of Law - No curve. Estimated class rankings are published after each semester. Estimates of numerical rankings are only reported after graduation.
 University at Buffalo Law School – no curve, but benchmarks for top 5%, 10%, 15%, 20% and 25% for each class are released after each semester
 Columbia Law School – Only 33% of 1L class grades are A-'s or higher. GPA not reported. Upper year courses have an easier curve. GPA calculated based on 4.33 scale.
 New York University School of Law – not reported, but likely around 3.4 after 1L.
 University of Michigan Law School – class rank is not established until after graduation
 University of New Mexico School of Law – class rank is not provided but a bar graph is provided showing GPA distribution
 University of Notre Dame Law School – 1L courses (except for 1L elective, which is graded as an upper‐level course, and Legal Writing (I & II)) mean must be between 3.25 and 3.30 with a mandatory distribution. 1L Legal Writing (I & II) Mean: 3.15 to 3.45. Large upper-level courses for 2L and 3L (>25 students) must have a mean between 3.25 and 3.35 with a mandatory distribution. Paper-Based Small Upper-Level Courses (10 to 24 students) Mean: 3.15 to 3.60. Small upper-level courses (10 to 24 students) must have a mean between 3.15 and 3.45 with no mandatory distribution. Small courses (9 or fewer students) do not have a required curve.
 University of Pennsylvania Law School – In typical circumstances moderate- to large-sized classes will approximate the following distribution (+/- 2%): the top 15% in the A category (including the grade of A+, if any), the next 20% in the A- category, followed by the next 30% in the B+ category, followed by the next 35% in the B category (including B- and C). Instructors can award a grade of B-, C, or Fail (No Credit) upon petitioning the Registrar. This curve is mandatory for all 1L courses, including electives. The 1L LPS course (Legal Writing) is graded on an Honors/Pass/Fail basis. Students may visit the registrar to get their GPA and/or class rank, but the school does not report that information or permit students to include it on resumes.  
 Rutgers School of Law–Camden – class rank was eliminated in 1972; each semester, the law school identifies Dean's Scholars as the top 5% and Dean's List as the next 20%; at graduation, highest honors and high honors are determined by the faculty and honors is given to the top 15%
 Rutgers School of Law–Newark – class rank is not published; however, upon graduation, rank is used to determine graduation honors with top 10% awarded Order of the Coif and cum laude; top 5% awarded magna cum laude; and top 1% awarded summa cum laude.
 University of Texas School of Law – "It is the policy of The University of Texas School of Law not to rank its students on the basis of academic standing." Therefore, students may not estimate class standing or indicate a percentile ranking on their resumes, cover letters or application materials.  UT Law does, however, release interim cutoffs to continuing students for top 25% and top 50% at the end of the school year.  Additionally, the school bestows honors on the top 1%, 5%, 10%, and 35% of graduating students.  The top sixteen students in the class at the end of the second year are also recognized as Chancellors, with the top four students being identified in order as Grand Chancellor, Vice-Chancellor, Clerk, and Keeper of the Peregrinus.

Irregular grading systems
The following law schools have adopted a grading system which does not allow for the calculation of a comparable median GPA on a 4.0 scale, if any GPA is recorded at all:
 Berkeley Law (aka Boalt Hall), University of California, Berkeley, Law School – pass/no pass system with 10% of first-years receiving pass with high honors and 30% of first-year students receiving pass with honors in each class; for upper division classes (2L and 3L years) up to 15% of in a class may receive high honors and up to 45% may receive either honors or high honors. Additionally, the top student in a course may be awarded the American Jurisprudence Award. The second-highest performing student in a course may be awarded the Prosser Prize.
 Campbell Law School – mandatory median (82, or a C)
 Harvard Law School – The current grading system of dean's scholar, honors, pass, low pass, and fail had at one time a recommended curve of 37% honors, 55% pass, and 8% low pass in classes with over 30 JD and LLM students, but the curve is no longer enforced in any manner. Between 1970 and 2008 Harvard established a GPA cut-off required in order to obtain the summa cum laude distinction.  During that time, only 5 students achieved the GPA required for the distinction of summa cum laude (33 out of the 38 years, the top student only managed to obtain the magna cum laude distinction, for example, there was a 15-year hiatus until Lisa Ann Grow managed to obtain summa cum laude).  Those who have managed to obtain the summa cum laude distinction include Lewis Sargentich ('70), Isaac Pachulski ('74), Peter Huber ('82), Lisa Ann Grow/Sun ('97), Julian Poon ('99).  Since 2008, to address the difficulty of obtaining the summa cum laude distinction, in a year where no student manages to meet the GPA cut-off, Harvard will now award summa cum laude to the top student of the year (a rank that did not guarantee summa cum laude in the past).
 Howard University School of Law – uses a scale of 72–100; the mandatory mean range for first-year courses is 81–83. Below are the class rankings:

 Northeastern University School of Law – written evaluations given for each course with honorifics (High Honors and Honors) awarded "for strong academic performance."
 Stanford Law School – pass/no pass system with honors and distinctions, with a hard limit of 30% honors in lecture classes and 40% in seminars
 University of Chicago Law School – uses unusual numeric grade with median of 177
 Wake Forest University School of Law – curved at 85 (ended with the Class of 2017). Beginning with the Class of 2018: curved at 88. *UPDATE - Beginning with the Class of 2019:  A+ 4.00; A 4.00; A- 3.67; B+ 3.33; B 3.00; B- 2.67; C+ 2.33; C 2.00; C- 1.67; D+ 1.33; D 1.00; D- 0.67; F 0.00; H Honors; P Pass; LP Low Pass; F Fail.
 Yale Law School – honors/pass/fail system with no fixed curve
 University of Wisconsin Law School - GPA calculated based on a 4.3 scale

Notes

Educational assessment and evaluation
Law schools in the United States